Enotoschema sericans is a species of beetle in the family Cerambycidae, and the only species in the genus Enotoschema. It was described by Breuning in 1953.

References

Enicodini
Beetles described in 1953